Cycling on ESPN is the de facto name for broadcasts of multiple-stage bicycle races airing on the ESPN cable television network.

Overview
ESPN was the exclusive American cable television outlet for the annual Tour de France event from 1992-2000. ESPN also broadcast the Tour DuPont race throughout the entirety of its existence from 1989 to 1996. ESPN also provided coverage of the 1988 Coors International Bicycle Classic, the 1989 World Professional Cycling Championships from Chambéry, France, the 1990 US Pro Cycling Championships in Philadelphia, and the 1996 U.S. Olympic Cycling Team Trials.

Tour de France coverage

From 1989 to 1991, ESPN only provided three one-hour long highlight specials for each race. Meanwhile, ESPN's sister network, ABC had only provided coverage that recapped the previous week's action on their Saturday afternoon anthology series, Wide World of Sports also since 1989. Come 1992, ESPN announced that they would devote at least 16 hours to covering the Tour the France. All in all, it would be the most comprehensive coverage that an American television network devoted to the Tour de France up until that time.

ESPN would air each stage on a same-day delay during the afternoon for the next 22 days. Instead of producing the broadcasts themselves from the ground up, ESPN relied on France's world feed.

In 2001, ESPN and ABC would be supplanted by the Outdoor Life Network in broadcasting the Tour de France.

Commentators

David Chauner 
Brian Drebber
Adrian Karsten - Karsten was known in the cycling community for his 'side-line' style reporting while anchoring during ESPN's broadcasts of the Tour de France. Karsten hosted the Tour de France from 1994 through 2000—more than any other American host.
Phil Liggett
Lon McEachern
Al Meltzer
Peter Rogot
Paul Sherwen
Barry Tompkins

See also
Sports broadcasting contracts in the United States#Cycling

References

External links

ESPN
ESPN original programming
ESPN2 original programming
1988 American television series debuts
2000 American television series endings
1980s American television series
1990s American television series
2000s American television series
Sports telecast series
American sports television series